Pseudocellus cookei is an arachnid species in the order Ricinulei. It occurs only in the cueva Jobitzinaj in Petén, Guatemala.

References 

 Gertsch, 1977 : On two ricinuleids from the Yucatan Peninsula (Arachnida: Ricinulei). Bulletin of the Association for Mexican Cave Studies, vol. 6, p. 133-138

Animals described in 1977
Cave arachnids
Ricinulei
Endemic fauna of Guatemala